Places of Worship (released 1 October 2013 in Oslo, Norway) is an album by Arve Henriksen.

Background 
This album marks the return of Henriksen to the label Rune Grammofon and furthers his collaboration with Jan Bang and Erik Honoré. He never separates himself from the environmental information provided by his natural Nordic landscape. The lush, wild, and open physical vistas of its geography provide an inner map for the trumpeter and vocalist that amounts to a deeply focused series of tone poems. While these tracks are impossible to separate from the influences of Jon Hassell's Fourth World Music explorations or the more murky moodscapes of Nils Petter Molvær, they are also more than a few steps removed from them. The experimentations within soundscapes, spaces, and texture bring the listener into sacred places the world over, hence its title.

Track listing 
(All original songs composed by Arve Henriksen, where not otherwise noted)

Personnel 
Arve Henriksen - trumpet, voice, field recordings
Erik Honoré – vocals, synth bass, sampler, drum programming
Jan Bang – sampler, programming
Eivind Aarset – guitar samples
Christian Wallumrød – piano samples
Jon Balke – piano samples
Lars Danielsson – double bass
Ingar Zach – percussion
Rolf Wallin – samples, crystal chord
Peter Tornquist – sampler, excerpts from Alba 
Ensemble Stahlquartett – Alexander Fülle, Jan Heinke, Michael Antoni, Peter Andrea
The Norwegian Wind Ensemble  – samples

Credits 
Cover – Kim Hiorthøy
Mastered By – Helge Sten
Producer – Erik Honoré, Jan Bang
Recorded By [Additional Recording By] – Arve Henriksen, Eivind Aarset, Ingar Zach
Recorded By [Basic Tracks] – Thomas Hukkelberg (track: #7)
Recorded By, Mixed By – Erik Honoré, Jan Bang

Notes 
Recorded and mixed at Punkt Studio, Kristiansand 
Alhambra basic tracks recorded live at Jakobskirken, Oslo 
Mastered at Audio Virus Lab

References

External links 
Arve Henriksen Official Website

2013 albums
Arve Henriksen albums
Rune Grammofon albums